The baseball competition at the 2014 Central American and Caribbean Games was held in Veracruz, Mexico.

The tournament was held from 15 to 21 November at the Beto Ávila Stadium.
This tournament served as a qualifier for the baseball tournament at the 2015 Pan-American Games in Toronto, Ontario, Canada. The top four teams each earned a berth in that tournament.

Medal summary

Schedule and results

Semifinals 5th-8th

Final Round

Medal table

Final standings

See also
Baseball at the 2015 Pan American Games

References

External links
Official Website

2014 Central American and Caribbean Games events
2014 in baseball
2014
Qualification tournaments for the 2015 Pan American Games